Zaragoza Comarca is a comarca in Aragon, Spain. It is located in the center of Zaragoza Province and includes Zaragoza metropolitan area.

Zaragoza city gives its name to this comarca.

Municipalities
Alfajarín, Botorrita, El Burgo de Ebro, Cadrete, Cuarte de Huerva, Fuentes de Ebro, Jaulín, María de Huerva, Mediana de Aragón, Mozota, Nuez de Ebro, Osera de Ebro, Pastriz, La Puebla de Alfindén, San Mateo de Gállego, Utebo, Villafranca de Ebro, Villamayor de Gállego, Villanueva de Gállego, Zaragoza, Zuera

See also
Zaragoza Province

References

External links 

Comarcalización de los pueblos de la provincia de Zaragoza
D.C. Zaragoza | Comarcaacomarca.com

Comarcas of Aragon
Zaragoza
Geography of the Province of Zaragoza